Something Else is the thirteenth studio album by American rapper Tech N9ne. It was released on July 30, 2013, by Strange Music, RBC Records and INgrooves. The album has broken up into three portions – Earth, Water & Fire. Production on the album was handled during 2012 to 2013, primarily by frequent collaborator Seven, among others such as Young Fyre, Drumma Boy, and Fredwreck. The album features guest appearances from B.o.B, Big K.R.I.T., CeeLo Green, The Doors, The Game, Kendrick Lamar, Serj Tankian, T-Pain, Trae tha Truth, and Wiz Khalifa, among others including several artists from Tech N9ne's Strange Music imprint.

Something Else was supported by two singles, "So Dope (They Wanna)" and "Fragile". The album received widespread acclaim from critics. Also faring well commercially, the album sold 58,300 copies in its first week of sale, and debuting at number four on the US Billboard 200.

Background
On February 8, 2013, the album was first announced on the Strange Music blog. During the preview on the Strange Music blog, Tech N9ne spoke about what to expect from the album, saying:  In March 2013, during an interview with The Arizona Daily Wildcat, Tech N9ne revealed the album has divided into three separate parts titled Fire, Water and Earth. The "Fire" section is a darker within the themes while the "Earth" section was shorter and has heavenly themes, similar to Tech's earlier album Anghellic. Tracks 2-10 are the Fire part, 11-13 the Water part and 14-24 the Earth section.

Recording and production
During the album's recording process, Tech N9ne worked with several of his Strange Music label mates including Big Scoob, Ces Cru, Krizz Kaliko, ¡Mayday!, Rittz and Stevie Stone. He also worked with various other collaborators, such as B.o.B, Big K.R.I.T., CeeLo Green, The Game, Info Gates, Red Café, Serj Tankian, T-Pain, The Doors and Trae tha Truth. While speaking with The Spokesman-Review about the album, when he has noted for the fact that he has been working with both Citizen Cope and Macklemore, but neither appeared on the album. Tech attempted to get Corey Taylor to record vocals for "Love 2 Dislike Me", however, Corey was unable to commit due to the timing because of personal reasons. Tech has given a consideration of trying to get James Hetfield to appear on the song.

In June 2013, the track listing revealed guest appearances on the album from Krizz Kaliko, Serj Tankian, T-Pain, Big Scoob, Red Café, Trae tha Truth, Liz Suwandi, Tyler Lyon, Kendall Morgan, Kendrick Lamar, ¡Mayday!, Angel Davenport, Game, Snow Tha Product, Twisted Insane, Wrekonize, B.o.B, Wiz Khalifa, Big K.R.I.T., CeeLo Green, Kutt Calhoun, Scoop DeVille, Rittz, Stevie Stone, Ces Cru, Danny Brown and The Doors. In April 2013, Tech N9ne spoke on why some artists and collaborations cannot make the cut, saying: "I write music on an impulse; I write it as I feel it. If I was just writing bullshit songs trying to make a hit, yeah, I could give you a song six months in advance. Nigga, I'm doing my album in a month's time. I'm writing it...recording it, going to write another one, really feeling the music for some months and then go in the studio for like a month and a half and do it. Everybody don't work like that."

In July 2013, Tech elaborated further on how the quick schedule for his albums kept him from securing features he wanted on the album. In a Q&A session hosted by Angela Yee during the album's official release party, Tech spoke on his intentions to have both Nas and Jay-Z on the album. Nas was initially sent the song "Burn the World", however, the rapper found the track too personal and requested Tech send him something else. Tech then had his producer, Seven, create a beat he called "The Rise & Fall of Y'all" which he intended to send to Nas but was unable due to timing. He also spoke on how he contacted producer Mike Dean, who at the time was engineering Watch The Throne 2, in an attempt to secure a Jay-Z verse for "That's My Kid", and while Dean had agreed to get Jay to listen to it, Tech ran out of time before having to put the album together. Producers on this album including Drumma Boy, Fredwreck, ¡Mayday!, Scoop DeVille, Michael "Seven" Summers and Young Fyre.

Release and promotion
On March 14, 2013, Strange Music released The Independent Powerhouse Sampler, where it featured snippets of songs from the album titled "Fortune Force Field", "So Dope", "Thizzles", "Meant To Happen", "Dwamn" and the album's first promotional single "B.I.T.C.H." featuring T-Pain. On July 2, 2013, "So Dope (They Wanna)" featuring Snow Tha Product, Twisted Insane and Wrekonize was released as the album's first single along with the pre-order of the album on iTunes. The song was described as being in the same vein of N9ne's previous song "Worldwide Choppers". On July 25, 2013, the music video for "So Dope (They Wanna)" featuring Snow tha Product, Twisted Insane and Wrekonize, was released.

On July 17, 2013, the Kendrick Lamar, Kendall Morgan and ¡Mayday! featuring song "Fragile", was released as the album's second single. On August 1, 2013, the music video was released for "Straight Out The Gate" featuring Serj Tankian. On August 6, 2013, the music video was released for "B.I.T.C.H." featuring T-Pain. On August 14, 2013, the music video was released for "Party The Pain Away" featuring Liz Suwandi. On August 29, 2013, the music video was released for "Love 2 Dislike Me" featuring Liz Suwandi and Tyler Lyon. On September 12, 2013, the music video was released for "Dwamn". On February 9, 2014, the music video was released for "Fragile" featuring Kendrick Lamar, ¡Mayday! and Kendall Morgan.

On March 27, 2013, the official album covers were revealed. In May 2013, Amazon revealed that the release date of the album would be pushed back from June 25, 2013, until July 30, 2013. On June 4, 2013, the album was released for pre-order on the Strange Music website, in three different variants including a standard, deluxe, and a vinyl version. All three come with two tracks; "Fortune Force Field", and "Party the Pain Away". The deluxe version will include an autographed copy of the CD (If pre-ordered), three bonus tracks, and a bonus DVD.

Critical reception

Something Else was met with widespread critical acclaim. At Metacritic, which assigns a normalized rating out of 100 to reviews from professional publications, the album received an average score of 85, based on five reviews.

David Jeffries of AllMusic said, "Building on the pop and polish of his 2011 release All 6's and 7's, this 2013 effort from Tech N9ne finds the angry and angsty rapper bringing back some of the horror show rap of his early days, which is good, because now his nightmares are not only vivid, but incredibly well-funded." Arasia Graham of HipHopDX said, "Something Else in all of its intense, loud, confusing and obnoxious glory is fluid in its musical movement and sincere in its content. The album is contradictory in subject matter and sound yet speaks to the idealistic and free flowing approach Tech takes when creating music. Tech N9ne sounds sharp over complicated production that has many layers to peel back. And he took big risks that will pay off, as Something Else will surely be a contender for album of the year. There are a few holes—the project's length and forgettable appearances (Wiz Khalifa on "See Me")—but overall, it's an incredible album that will keep that hint of burgundy in the sky." Erin Lowers of Exclaim! said, "While 18 full tracks is a bold move, it's not the best. Songs like "Dwamn", "Strange 2013" and "Meant to Happen" fall by the wayside, and ultimately break the record's power. Nevertheless, the standout numbers are potent enough to carry this from start to finish." Steve Jones of USA Today said, "The Kansas City rapper explores facets of his personality – fire, water, earth – using a variety of flows and eclectic beats. He harnesses a prodigious guest list (Cee Lo, Kendrick Lamar, Serj Tankian, T-Pain, The Doors) to create something unconventional."

Eric Diep of XXL said, "Though Tech proves he's a master of the flow and storytelling ("My Haiku—Burn The World", "Fragile", "Priorities"), his approach to what he dubs as "beautiful music" has yet to reach the level of pop culture icon. Something Else—his most cohesive balance of indie and mainstream—will be remembered as an album that brought him closer to acceptance. Whether Tech wants the bigger fame or not is unclear, but it's safe to say the growth he displays here is one step nearer. He's strange, he's provocative, but the lesser shock value on this album marks it as his true debut to a larger audience." Paul Cantor of Vibe gave the album a positive review, saying "Is Something Else a milestone in Tech N9ne's career, the quintessential album he's been waiting to make his whole career? Tough to say. The LP has a cornucopia of guests, but they all show up in force and only occasionally detract from the material. There aren't any blatantly bad songs, but sure, you might skip a few. It happens. And do all the tracks fit neatly into the project's conceptual arc? No, but even attempting something like that is a tall task, and the album as a straight listen certainly exhibits a noted change in musical direction as it plays, which is a commendable. Though he's not exactly the outsider he once was, Tech N9ne fans—the die-hards and the johnny-come-latelys—should really enjoy this album." Steve Juon of RapReviews said, "Is "Something Else" excessive? Not for a 20+ year veteran who has been a certified star for at least 14, and not given how many guest features factor in. It's a sign of Tech's confidence that the lead single "So Dope (They Wanna)" gives equal time to Wrekonize, Snow Tha Product and Twisted Insane flowing over the Shane Eli/Jon Pakfar beat - and Tech's flow on the opening verse shows he hasn't slowed with age."

Accolades
Something Else was ranked at number 23 on XXLs list of the best albums of 2013. They commented saying, "There's plenty for everyone here: dark emotional songs ("I'm Not A Saint",) trap hyphy bangers ("Dwamn") and radio-friendly cuts ("See Me"). Despite the fact that Tech is exploring heavy metal rock with his Therapy EP, you can always count on him for a solid hip-hop album."

Commercial performance
Something Else debuted at number four on the US Billboard 200, with first-week sales of 58,000 copies in the United States. It would be the highest first week sales of an album for his career. In its second week, the album sold 17,000 more copies in the United States. In its third week, the album sold 10,000 more copies in the United States. In its fourth week, the album sold 7,000 more copies bringing its total album sales to 92,000.

Track listing
Credits adapted from the album's liner notes.

Notes
  signifies an additional producer
 "Straight Out the Gate" features additional vocals by Ashton Summers, Avery Geiger, Christina Summers, Christopher Watson Jr., Izabel Castellano, Jasmyn Geiger, Mackenzie O'Guin, and Roneesha Geiger
 "Dwamn" features additional vocals by Emma Frost
 "My Haiku-Burn the World" features additional vocals by Crystal Watson and Delynia Brown
 "That's My Kid" features additional vocals by Avery Geiger, Crystal Watson, and Delynia Brown
 "Believe" features additional vocals by Crystal Watson, Delynia Brown, Kendra Matthews, and Kortney Leveringston
 "Colorado" features additional vocals by DJ P-Caso, Frizz, Scenario, and Info Gates
 "Thizzles" features additional vocals by Richie Abbott

Sample credits
 "Strange 2013" contains a sample of "Strange Days" as performed by The Doors.

Personnel
Credits adapted from AllMusic.

 Shane Eli Abrahams – producer
 Derek "MixedByAli" Ali – vocal engineer
 Chris Athens – mastering
 Bernz – producer, vocals
 Big K.R.I.T. – vocals
 Big Scoob – featured artist, vocals
 B.o.B – featured artist, vocals
 Sam Bohl – assistant engineer
 Delynia Brown – vocals
 Violet Brown – production assistant
 Kutt Calhoun – vocals
 Valdora Case – production assistant
 Gianni Ca$h – producer, vocals
 Izabel Castellano – vocals
 Liz Codd – violin
 Glenda Cowan – production assistant
 Ben Cybulsky – arranger, engineer, mixing
 Angel Davanport – vocals
 The Doors – featured artist
 Jim Fanning – cover illustration
 Brett Turner Francis – string arrangements, string conductor
 Emma Frost – vocals
 Game – vocals
 Avery Geiger – vocals
 Jasmyn Geiger – vocals
 Roneesha Geiger – vocals
 Drumma Boy – producer
 Cee Lo Green – vocals
 Lan Jiang – cello
 Krizz Kaliko – featured artist, vocals
 Kendrick Lamar – featured artist, vocals
 Kortney Leveringston – vocals
 Andrew Lloyd – additional production
 Korey Lloyd – production assistant
 Tyler Lyon – featured artist, vocals
 Fabian Marasciullo – mixing
 Kendra Matthews – vocals
 ¡Mayday! – featured artist
 James Meierotto – photography
 Elijah Molina – featured artist, producer, vocals
 Kendall Morgan – featured artist, vocals
 "Fredwreck" Farid Nassar – additional production
 Cory Nielsen – production assistant
 Dawn O'Guin – production assistant
 Mackenzie O'Guin – vocals
 Jonathan Pakfar – producer
 Fabio Peixoto – violin
 Daniel "Keys" Perez – producer
 Red Café – featured artist, vocals
 Sadikov String Quartet – strings
 Shokhrukh Sadikov – viola
 Snow tha Product – featured artist, vocals
 Ashton Summers – vocals
 Christina Summers – vocals
 Michael "Seven" Summers – associate producer, bass, producer
 Liz Suwandi – featured artist, vocals
 T-Pain – featured artist, vocals
 Serj Tankian – featured artist, vocals
 Tech N9ne – primary artist
 Trae Tha Truth – featured artist, vocals
 Travis O'Guin – executive producer
 Twisted Insane – featured artist, vocals
 Ralfy "FAFA" Valencia – producer
 Crystal Watson – vocals
 Christopher Watson, Jr. – vocals
 Dave Weiner – associate producer
 Jace Wilbert – guitar
 Tramaine "Youngfyre" Winfrey – producer
 Wiz Khalifa – featured artist, vocals
 Wrekonize – featured artist, producer, vocals

Charts

Weekly charts

Year-end charts

References

2013 albums
Tech N9ne albums
Albums produced by Seven (record producer)
Albums produced by Drumma Boy
Strange Music albums